The Tosan tank is an Iranian light tank based on the FV101 Scorpion.

Tosan may also refer to:

 Tosan (missile), an Iranian clone of the 9M113 Konkurs
 Tosan County, North Hwanghae Province, North Korea